Sonia Couling (also spelled Sonia Cooling, Sonya Couling or Sonya Cooling) (June 18, 1974 in Bangkok, Thailand), nickname Pim, is a Thai model, actress and television personality. She has appeared in many Thai films and TV shows, been a VJ for MTV Asia, been a host for HBO Asia and has produced and hosted Thailand's Next Top Model in 2005. Couling has also acted in Hollywood and French productions. She is of English and Thai descent.

Biography

Early life 
Couling is Eurasian or Luk khrueng, with an English father and a Thai mother; fluent in Thai, English and French. She also speaks German and Italian. She attended St Michael's all-girls boarding school in Surrey, England and studied German literature at University College London. She graduated from European Business School London (EBS London) with Bachelor of International Business in 1998.

Career 
Couling started her modeling career in a Seven Up advertisement when she was 13. While attending boarding school and university in the UK, she worked with Storm modeling agency in London.

Once back in Asia she settled into a supermodel role, she has been the face of beauty products over Asia, like L'Oreal Asia, Olay Asia, Nivea Visage, Eucerin, 1st Asian Ambassador for Rado watches, Clairol Worldwide and plenty more.

In 1998 Couling became VJ for MTV Asia, based in Singapore.

In 1999 Couling was voted Thailand's sexiest woman by FHM. The UK magazine FHM chose her as number one sexiest woman in Thailand and second in Asia and 10 sexiest women in the world. In 2016 she was chosen as the most beautiful Thai actress.

In 2002 she won Best Actress in a Lead Role at the TV Gold Awards (Thai television awards) for her performance as Phitawan Satchamat in Thai TV series  (2001).

Couling also works behind the cameras producing TV show Thailand's Next Top Model (2005) and internationally as the executive producer on A Stranger in Paradise (2013).

In addition, Couling has starred in international films and TV series, including The Mark, The Mark: Redemption and Strike Back : Legacy.

In 2018, she appeared on The Face Thailand season 4 All Stars and The Face Men Thailand (season 2) as a mentor and The Next Boy/Girl Band Thailand as a producer.

The face of Muay Thai 
Couling, who is Thailand's number one international celebrity and has been involved in many Muay Thai projects, has been chosen to be the face of Muay Thai.

Her in-depth experience with Muay Thai, includes having been an English announcer in Jao Muay Thai Fight at Siam Boxing Stadium on Thai TV3 for 3 years, hosted and MC'd The 2010 King's Cup and The 2010 Queen's Cup and plenty more. She, moreover, appeared on The Challenger Muay Thai (2011) on AXN as a ring announcer, and hosted Muay Thai Premier League (2012) on FOX.

Personal life 
On 8 September 2007, Couling married Paul-Dominique Vacharasinthu, who is Thai-French. They have a son, Pasha-Dominic Vacharasinthu (b. 21 October 2015).

Couling flies single engine planes, reserve pilot for the Royal Thai Air Force where she was a guest pilot on the F5 and F16 fighter planes. She is also a horse rider and female polo player.

In January 2023, she was a guest at the royal wedding of Princess Azemah of Brunei.

Filmography

Television

TV series

TV Program

Production 
 Thailand's Next Top Model as Executive producer
 A Stranger in Paradise as Executive producer

Endorsements

 Seven Up (1989, Thailand) (debut)
 Coffeemate (1992, Thailand) 
 Kotex Soft Dry (1995, Thailand)
 Nissin Cup Noodle (1996, Thailand)
 Spy Drinks (1999, Thailand)
 Honda City Type-Z (2002, Thailand)
 Sony Vega TV (2005, Thailand)
 Ricoh Printers (2005, Thailand)
 AIS GSM (2006, Thailand)
 Olay Total Effects (2007, Thailand)
 Ocean 1 Tower (2008, Thailand)
 Eucerin (2012, Thailand)
 Sunsilk (Thailand)
 Nivea (Thailand)
 Doritos 3D (Thailand)
 Kodak Film (Thailand)
 Christian Dior; J’adore L’or (2018, Thailand)
 Clairol Shampoo (Worldwide)
 Olay Total Effects (Asia)
 L'Oreal (Asia)
 Rado Watches (Asia)
 Nikon Cameras (Asia)
 Secrets Deodorant (Thailand & Philippines)
 Smart Telecom (Philippines)
 Singapore Telecom (Singapore)
 Haagan Dazs (Singapore)
 Eucerin (2017, Malaysia)

Awards

References

External links

 
 
 
 
 
 Sonia Couling on Doramatv.ru
 Sonia Couling on Kinopoisk.ru

 Sonia Couling on Port.hu
 Sonia Couling on Cinemagia.ro
 Sonia Couling on Daum
 Siam Zone : Star Gallery : Sonia Couling
 Sonia Couling on World's Most Beautiful Face
 Fashion Model Directory - Sonia Couling
 Sonia couling on Eurasian Blog

1974 births
Living people
Sonia Couling
Sonia Couling
Sonia Couling
Sonia Couling
Sonia Couling
Sonia Couling
Sonia Couling
Sonia Couling
VJs (media personalities)
Thai television personalities
Sonia Couling
Alumni of European Business School London